Bent is a 1997 British-Japanese drama film directed by Sean Mathias, based on the 1979 play of the same name by Martin Sherman, who also wrote the screenplay. It revolves around the persecution of homosexuals in Nazi Germany after the murder of SA leader Ernst Röhm on the Night of the Long Knives.

Plot
Max (Clive Owen) is a promiscuous gay man living in 1930s Berlin. He is at odds with his wealthy family because of his homosexuality. One evening, much to the resentment of his boyfriend, Rudy (Brian Webber II), Max brings home a handsome Sturmabteilung (SA) man (Nikolaj Coster-Waldau). Unfortunately, he does so on the Night of the Long Knives, when Hitler ordered the assassination of upper echelon SA corps.  The Sturmabteilung man is discovered and killed by SS men in Max and Rudy's apartment, and the two have to flee Berlin.

Max's Uncle Freddie (Ian McKellen) has organised new papers for Max, but Max refuses to leave his boyfriend behind. As a result, Max and Rudy are found and arrested by the Gestapo and put on a train headed for Dachau. On the train, Rudy is brutally beaten to death by the guards. As Rudy calls out to Max when he is taken away, Max lies to the guards, denying he is gay. In the camp, Max falls in love with Horst (Lothaire Bluteau), who shows him the dignity that lies in acknowledging one's beliefs. After Horst's death, Max finds the courage to be true to himself and takes his own life.

Cast
 Clive Owen as Max
 Lothaire Bluteau as Horst
 Ian McKellen as Uncle Freddie
 Brian Webber II as Rudy
 Nikolaj Coster-Waldau as Wolf
 Mick Jagger as Greta
 Jude Law as Stormtrooper
 Paul Bettany as Captain
 Rachel Weisz as Prostitute

Reception

Critical reception
Bent has an overall approval rating of 72% on Rotten Tomatoes based on 25 reviews, with a weighted average of 6.4/10. The site's consensus reads: "Bent juggles heavy topics with style, though its heavy-handedness at times feels more like exploitation than exploration".

Awards
 1997: Won Award of the Youth at the Cannes Film Festival
 1998: Won Best Feature Film in the Torino International Gay & Lesbian Film Festival

References

External links
 
 

List_of_Holocaust_films
1997 films
1990s war drama films
British war drama films
British LGBT-related films
English-language Japanese films
Films scored by Philip Glass
Films directed by Sean Mathias
LGBT-related films based on actual events
British films based on plays
Japanese war drama films
Japanese LGBT-related films
Films about violence against LGBT people
Homophobia in fiction
Films set in Berlin
Films set in the 1930s
Holocaust films
Films about Nazi Germany
Metro-Goldwyn-Mayer films
Film4 Productions films
1997 LGBT-related films
Gay-related films
Persecution of homosexuals in Nazi Germany
1997 drama films
British World War II films
1997 directorial debut films
1990s English-language films
1990s British films
1990s Japanese films